Nerd Nation is an American TV show on TechTV that focused on the life of nerds and other geeks. The series lasted 10 episodes. Re-runs also ran on G4 in late 2005.

The theme song I'm a Nerd was performed by Johnny Sizzle.

Episodes

TechTV original programming
2004 American television series debuts
2004 American television series endings